The Eastern Zone was one of the three regional zones of the 1971 Davis Cup.

9 teams entered the Eastern Zone, competing across 2 sub-zones. The winner of each sub-zones would play against each other to determine who would compete in the Inter-Zonal Zone against the winners of the Americas Zone and Europe Zone.

Japan defeated Australia in the Zone A final, and India received a walkover in the Zone B final after Pakistan withdrew. In the Inter-Zonal final India defeated Japan and progressed to the Inter-Zonal Zone.

Zone A

Draw

Quarterfinals
Hong Kong vs. Australia

Semifinals
Indonesia vs. Australia

Philippines vs. Japan

Final
Japan vs. Australia

Zone B

Draw

Semifinals
Ceylon vs. India

Pakistan vs. Malaysia

Final
India defeated Pakistan by walkover.

Eastern Inter-Zonal Final
Japan vs. India

References

External links
Davis Cup official website

Davis Cup Asia/Oceania Zone
Eastern Zone
Davis Cup
Davis Cup
Davis Cup
Davis Cup
Davis Cup
Davis Cup